I Am Shelby Lynne is the sixth studio album by American singer-songwriter Shelby Lynne, released on April 10, 1999, in the United Kingdom and on January 25, 2000, in the United States. After several years of lackluster results from recording various styles of country music in and around Nashville, Lynne co-wrote and recorded this album in Palm Springs, California, incorporating confessional lyrics with musical elements from blues and rock and roll. Lynne collaborated on this album with producer Bill Bottrell, who had previously worked with Sheryl Crow on her debut album, Tuesday Night Music Club.

The album is considered to be Lynne's breakout work, and the catalyst toward her receiving her first career Grammy award as Best New Artist of 2000.  The award came more than a decade after Lynne's debut album, 1989's Sunrise.

Reception

Writing for AllMusic, Stephen Thomas Erlewine described the album as a sign of Lynne's reinvention of herself as a "tough and sexy singer", comparing her to Bonnie Raitt and Sheryl Crow. He praised Bill Bottrell's production of the album and said that Lynne "finally sounds comfortable in her writing and voice", and that with this album, she has "finally [found] her groove".

Rolling Stone's Parke Puterbaugh said that the album had more jazz and soul about it than country, but that it had "a genuine evocation of country". He said that the tracks "[seduce] you ... rather than bowling you over". He praised Lynne's harmonies, calling them "nothing less than righteous."

Track listing
"Your Lies" (Bill Bottrell, Shelby Lynne) — 2:54
"Leavin'" (Lynne) — 3:11
"Life Is Bad" (Bottrell, Roger Fritz, Lynne) — 3:18
"Thought It Would Be Easier" (Bottrell, Lynne) — 3:55
"Gotta Get Back" (Bottrell, Lynne, Dorothy Overstreet) — 3:37
"Why Can't You Be?" (Bottrell, Lynne) — 4:19
"Lookin' Up" (Bottrell, Lynne) — 3:28
"Dreamsome" (Jay Joyce, Lynne, Overstreet) — 4:12
"Where I'm From" (Bottrell, Lynne) — 3:49
"Black Light Blue" (Bottrell, Lynne) — 3:23

Personnel

Music
Bill Bottrell – organ, bass guitar, acoustic guitar, electric guitar, harmonica, percussion, pedal steel guitar, drums, keyboards, background vocals, 12 string guitar, snare drum, clapping, stomping
Jameson Brandt – string contractor
Greg d'Augelli – flute, keyboards, string bass
George Del Barrio – conductor, string arrangements
Roger Fritz – dobro, acoustic guitar, slide guitar, slide mandolin
Jay Joyce – organ, bass guitar, acoustic guitar, electric guitar, keyboards
Shelby Lynne – acoustic guitar, electric guitar, lead vocals, background vocals, clapping, stomping
Dorothy Overstreet – drums, snare drum

Production
Bill Bottrell – producer, mixing
Mark Cross – engineer, mixing
Terry Doty – project administrator
Ivy Scoff – project coordinator
Design
Thomas Bird – art direction
Rick Lecoat – design
Rick Patrick – art direction
Rankin – photography

Singles
"Your Lies" – 1999
1. "Your Lies"
2. "Shoulda' Been Betta'"
3. "Miss You Sissy"
4. "Why Cant You Be"
"Leavin'" – Release Date: May 9, 2000
1. "Leavin'"
2. "Life Is Bad" (Live)
3. "Black Light Blue" (Live)
"Gotta Get Back" – 2000
1. album version (3:36)
2. remix (3:37)
3. call out research hook (:10)

References

1999 albums
Shelby Lynne albums
Albums produced by Bill Bottrell